is a Japanese manga series written and illustrated by Peko Watanabe. It was serialized in Kodansha's seinen manga magazine Monthly Morning Two from September 2016 to May 2020, with its chapters collected in seven tankōbon volumes.

Publication
It was serialized in Kodansha's seinen manga magazine Monthly Morning Two from September 21, 2016 to May 22, 2020. Kodansha collected its chapters in seven tankōbon volumes, released from May 23, 2017 to July 20, 2020.

In North America, the manga is licensed for English digital release by Kodansha USA. The first volume was published on October 22, 2019.

Volume list

Reception1122: For a Happy Marriage was nominated for the 12th Manga Taishō in 2019. In December 2019, Brutus magazine listed 1122: For a Happy Marriage'' on their "Most Dangerous Manga" list, which included works with the most "stimulating" and thought-provoking themes.

References

External links
 

Kodansha manga
Marriage in anime and manga
Romance anime and manga
Seinen manga